Anne Keefe may refer to:
 Anne Keefe (theatre director)
 Anne Keefe (broadcaster)